My Word Coach is a video game from Ubisoft for the Nintendo DS, Wii and iOS. It involves vocabulary and is intended to develop the ability to express oneself with confidence. The data of three players may be saved, and one can compete on the Nintendo DS and Wii platforms using Nintendo Wi-Fi Connection.

Gameplay 
There are six training exercises for one player, as well as 4 games for multiple players

References

External links
 Ubisoft Makes Serious, Casual Moves With My Coach

2007 video games
Wii games
Nintendo DS games
Video games developed in Canada
IOS games
Language learning video games
Ubisoft games
Games with Wii-DS connectivity
Multiplayer and single-player video games